Mittleres Schwarzatal is a former Verwaltungsgemeinschaft ("municipal association") in the district Saalfeld-Rudolstadt, in Thuringia, Germany. The seat of the Verwaltungsgemeinschaft was in Sitzendorf. It was disbanded in January 2019.

The Verwaltungsgemeinschaft Mittleres Schwarzatal consisted of the following municipalities:
Allendorf 
Bechstedt
Döschnitz 
Dröbischau
Mellenbach-Glasbach 
Meura 
Oberhain 
Rohrbach
Schwarzburg 
Sitzendorf
Unterweißbach

References

Former Verwaltungsgemeinschaften in Thuringia